Copies of the World Radio TV Handbook (including the 1991 edition) have identified 1602 kHz as a local frequency, akin to the Class C (former Class IV) radio stations in North America which are limited to 1kW.

The following radio stations broadcast on AM frequency 1602 kHz:

Australia 
2CP in Cooma, NSW (ABC SE New South Wales)
5LC in Leigh, SA (ABC North & West)
3WL in Warrnambool, VIC (ABC South West Victoria)

Japan
JOCC in Asahikawa
JODD in Fukuyama
JOFD in Fukushima
JOKC in Kofu 
JOSB in Kitakyushu

Korea
HLQE Sabuk (KBS-1)

The Netherlands
Radio Seagull

The Philippines
DZUP: Quezon City

United Kingdom
Desi Radio: London (Southall) 

Lists of radio stations by frequency